TB3 may refer to:

 Baykar Bayraktar TB3, unmanned combat aerial vehicle
 Tupolev TB-3, Soviet monoplane heavy bomber